Boreczek may refer to the following places in Poland:
Boreczek, Lower Silesian Voivodeship (south-west Poland)
Boreczek, Subcarpathian Voivodeship (south-east Poland)
Boreczek, Masovian Voivodeship (east-central Poland)
Boreczek, Greater Poland Voivodeship (west-central Poland)
Boreczek, Warmian-Masurian Voivodeship (north Poland)